Abdullah Cevdet (‎; ; 9 September 1869 – 29 November 1932) was a Kurdish intellectual and physician in the Ottoman Empire. He was one of the founders of the Committee of Union and Progress (CUP) and wrote articles with pen name of "Bir Kürd" ("A Kurd") for the publications such as Meşveret, Kurdistan and Roji Kurd about Kurdish awakening and nationalism. In 1908, he joined the Democratic Party which merged with the Freedom and Accord Party in 1911. He was also a translator, radical free-thinker, and an ideologist of the CUP until 1908.

Biography 
The son of a physician, and himself a graduate from the Military College in Istanbul as an ophthalmologist, Cevdet, initially a pious Muslim, was influenced by Western materialistic philosophies and was against institutionalized religion, but thought that "although the Muslim God was of no use in the modern era, Islamic society must preserve Islamic principles". He published the periodical İçtihat from 1904–1932, in which articles he used to promote his modernist thoughts. He was arrested and expelled from his country several times due to his political activities and lived in Europe, in cities including Vienna, Geneva and Paris.

His poetry was linked with the Symbolist movement in France, and he received accolades from leading French authors like Gustave Kahn.

He thanked and met Theodor Herzl for one of his poem published in Neue Freie Presse in 1903. After this acquaintance, he started to help Theodor Herzl in translating letters of him into Turkish.

The overall goal of early Young Turks such as Cevdet was to bring to end the absolutist regime of Sultan Abdul Hamid II. Cevdet and four other medical students (including Ibrahim Temo) at the Military Medical Academy in Istanbul founded the society of Ottoman Progress in 1889, which would become the "Committee of Union and Progress" (CUP). Initially with no political agenda, it became politicized by several leaders and factions and mounted the Young Turk Revolution against Abdul Hamid II in 1908. However, Abdullah Cevdet and Ibrahim Temo cut their ties with the CUP soon after 1902, as the CUP began to advocate a Turkist nationalist policy. Instead he promoted his secular ideas in his magazine İçtihat, where he published articles in support of several policies, which later were part of Atatürk's Reforms like the shutting down of the madrases or the furthering of women's rights. In 1908 he joined the Ottoman Democratic Party which was founded against the CUP. In 1912 he and Hüseyin Cahit advocated without success for the Latin script to be introduced in the Ottoman Empire.

Cevdet was tried several times in the Ottoman Empire because some of his writings were considered as blasphemy against Islam and Muhammad. For this reason, he was labelled as the "eternal enemy of Islam" (Süssheim, EI) and called "Aduvullah" (the enemy of God). His most famous court case was due to his defense of the Baháʼí Faith, which he considered an intermediary step between Islam and the final abandonment of religious belief, in his article in İçtihat on 1 March 1922. For a brief period between 1921 and 1922 he was active for Kurdish independence.

Religion and science
Cevdat wanted to fuse religion and materialism, that is, under the influence of Victor Hugo and Jean-Marie Guyau, discard God but keep religion as a social force. In one poem he says:We are pious infidels; our faith is that 
Being a disciple of God is tantamount to love.

What we drink at our drinking party is
The thirst for the infinite.

"Ranging from the New Testament to the Qur’ān, from Plato to Abū al-‘Alā’ al-Ma’arrī, he created an eclectic philosophy, reconciling science, religion, and philosophy with one another", and in order to specifically build an "Islamic materialism" (he was a translator of Ludwig Büchner, one of the main popularizers of scientific materialism at the end of the 19th century), he would use medieval mystical authors like Al-Maʿarri, Omar Khayyam and Rumi, and try to find correspondence in their works with modern authors such as Voltaire, Cesare Lombroso, Vittorio Alfieri and Baron D'Holbach. His "final step was to present modern scientific theories ranging from Darwinism to genetics as repetitions of Islamic holy texts or derivations from the writings of Muslim thinkers", trying to fit the Qur'an or ahadith with the ideas of peoples like Théodule Armand Ribot or Jean-Baptiste Massillon. He found that "the Qur’ān both alluded to and summarized the theory of evolution."

Disillusioned by the ulema's lukewarm response to his role as "materialist mujtahid" (as he would term it), he turned to heterodoxy, the Bektashi (he called "Turkish Stoicism") and then Baháʼísm. Being unfruitful in that regard as well, he'd spent his last efforts as purely intellectual.

Death
Left alone in his final years, Abdullah Cevdet died at the age of 63 on 29 November 1932. His body was brought for religious funeral service to Hagia Sophia, which was still used as a mosque at that time. However, nobody claimed his coffin, and it was expressed by some religious conservatives that he "did not deserve" Islamic funeral prayer. Following an appeal of Peyami Safa, a notable writer, the funeral prayer was performed. His body was then taken by city servants to the Merkezefendi Cemetery for burial.

Notes

References
 Şerif Mardin, Jön Türklerin Siyasi Fikirleri, 1895–1908, Istanbul 1964 (1992), 221–50.
 idem, Continuity and Change in the Ideas of the Young Turks, expanded text of a lecture given at the School of Business Administration and Economics Robert College, 1969, 13–27.
 Frank W. Creel, The program and ideology of Dr. Abdullah Cevdet: a study of the origins of Kemalism in Turkey (unpublished PhD thesis), The University of Chicago, 1978.
 M. Şükrü Hanioğlu, Bir siyasal düşünür olarak Doktor Abdullah Cevdet ve Dönemi, Istanbul, 1981.
 idem, Bir siyasal örgüt olarak Osmanlı Ittihad ve Terakki Cemiyeti ve Jon Türklük, Istanbul, 1986.
 idem, The Young Turks in Opposition, Oxford University Press, 1995.
 Necati Alkan, "The eternal enemy of Islam: Abdullah Cevdet and the Baha'i Religion", Bulletin of the School of Oriental and African Studies, 68:1, 2005, 1-20.

External links

1869 births
1932 deaths
People from Arapgir
Kurdish people from the Ottoman Empire
19th-century people from the Ottoman Empire
Kurdish academics
Kurdish physicians
Burials at Merkezefendi Cemetery
Kurdish writers
Young Turks
Kurdish atheists
Kurdish politicians
Turkish atheists